The Seychelles Port Authority (SPA) is a government agency of Seychelles, created by the Seychelles Ports Authority Act 2004, that governs and operates the ports of the country, principally the Port of Victoria.  It was formerly known as the Ports and Marine Services Division (of the Seychelles' Ministry of Transport).  Seychelles is an archipelago country in the western region of the  Indian Ocean and its ports handle both cargo and pleasure boat trade. The Authority is located in Victoria.

See also
Government of Seychelles
:Category:Islands of Seychelles
Transport in Seychelles

References

External links
Seychelles Port Authority official site

Government agencies of Seychelles
Transport in Seychelles
Port authorities
Ports and harbours in Africa
2004 establishments in Seychelles
Victoria, Seychelles
Government agencies established in 2004